Haruko Miyaguchi (née Fukuda, born March 5, 1976) is a Japanese politician who has served as a member of the House of Councillors (the upper house of the National Diet) since 2021. She represents the Hiroshima at-large district. She is a member of the Constitutional Democratic Party of Japan.

Career 
Haruko Miyaguchi was born Haruko Fukuda in Hiroshima Prefecture on March 5, 1976. She attended the Osaka College of Music and graduated from the Department of Vocal Music. In 2000 she began working as a newscaster for Setonaikai Broadcasting Co. She held this post until 2010, when she began working for radio outlet Fukuyama Broadcasting Co., Ltd. In 2011, she became a freelance announcer. In 2014, she began working as the representative for the "Help Mark" initiative, created by the Tokyo Metropolitan Government in 2012 to help disabled people receive special treatment in public facilities. In 2021 she was elected to her present post in the House of Councillors. She currently serves on the Committee for Financial Affairs.

References 

1976 births
Living people
People from Hiroshima Prefecture
Constitutional Democratic Party of Japan politicians
Members of the House of Councillors (Japan)